Stephanopis altifrons is a species of crab spider found in Australia. The body length may reach up to 10 and 6 mm in the female and male, respectively. The colour is usually brown, or shades of grey, and sometimes black. The egg sac is 7.5 mm in diameter. Often hidden in crevices of tree bark, it is irregular in shape and camouflaged with the debris. Eggs are off-white, 25 to 30 in number. The female rests with the eggs. The food of this spider appears to be other spiders. Recorded prey include members of the families Salticidae and Hersiliidae.

Taxonomic issues 
According to Pickard-Cambridge, the single specimen used for the description of S. altifrons (the holotype) was dry-pinned rather than preserved in ethanol. Therefore, the specimen could not be properly examined, so it was not possible to determine if the specimen was an adult. Moreover, he described his own sketch of the spider as “hasty”. This may explain why the somatic characters were inadequately described, genitalic features were not mentioned at all, and the illustrations were insufficiently detailed, making it difficult for others to distinguish this species.

See also 
 List of Thomisidae species

References 

Thomisidae
Spiders of Australia
Endemic fauna of Australia
Spiders described in 1869
Taxa named by Octavius Pickard-Cambridge